Paul Gustard (born 2 February 1976) is a former rugby union footballer who played for Leicester Tigers, London Irish and Saracens at flanker. He was captain of rugby and educated at the Royal Grammar School in Newcastle and is the son of former Gosforth favourite Steve Gustard, who was the club's leading try scorer for several seasons in the late 1970s. He gained Full County Cap honours with Durham County & was selected to captain the England u21 tour to Australia under Manager Jeff Probyn. An extraordinary honour as he was the only player not to be attached to a Premiership Rugby Squad.

Gustard was offered a full-time contract by Bob Dwyer to join Leicester Tigers in the summer of 1997 following his hilarious turn as a milk maid on the England U21 tour, and went on to make his debut against Leinster in the Heineken Cup, which preceded his try scoring league debut against Sale in October 1997. Gustard went on to make 97 competitive appearances for the Tigers, including being a used replacement in the famous Heineken Cup final versus Stade Français, and being part of the squad where they won 4 Premiership titles in his 5 years at the club.

He left in 2002 to join London Irish, and went on to make 98 appearances in 4 years for the Exiles, including a spell as the first team captain before he moved in 2006 to join London rivals Saracens, where he was part of a squad that were two of the club's most successful years competing in 4 semi finals in 6 competitions, including the last minute loss to Munster in the semi final of the Heineken Cup in 2008 under head coach Alan Gaffney. Gustard went on to make 48 appearances for the Men in Black, before incoming head coach Eddie Jones offered him the role as an assistant first team coach. Following Jones departure of the club, Saracens appointed Brendan Venter, the former Springbok centre, as Director of Rugby who made Gustard his defence and forwards coach.

Gustard had an injury blighted career, but managed to represent England at all levels and the Barbarians. He was in the England pre World Cup squad in 1999 of 36 before it finally got cut to 30 playing against the US in August 1999. He ultimately never played for the senior side.

On 17 December 2015 it was announced that Gustard had been appointed as the England Rugby team's defence coach, supporting the recently appointed team coach, Eddie Jones. Jones noted that "He has overseen Saracens' growth as a team, he has produced an aggressive defence system there and we are hoping he can do the same for England."

On May 21, 2018 it was announced that he will be the new Head of Rugby at Harlequins ahead of the 2018–19 season. He left the role by mutual consent in January 2021. It was confirmed the following week that he had joined Italian side Benetton as an assistant coach.

References

External links
 

1976 births
Living people
English rugby union players
Leicester Tigers players
London Irish players
Rugby union players from Newcastle upon Tyne
Saracens F.C. players
Rugby union flankers